The Saba least gecko (Sphaerodactylus sabanus) is a gecko endemic to the Lesser Antilles in the Caribbean, where it can be found on Saba, Sint Eustatius, Saint Kitts, and Nevis.

Both sexes reach a maximum length of about 30 mm snout-to-vent.  Its dorsal color is brown, and its head is tinted orange.  Its ventral surface ranges from white to light brown, with a white or yellow throat.  Its head is marked with dark stripes that extend from its snout that may break up into spots.  It has a dark (or dark-bordered) spot on the back of its head, and its body and tail are usually covered with rows of paler, smaller spots.

References

.

External links

Sphaerodactylus sabanus at the Encyclopedia of Life
Sphaerodactylus sabanus at the Reptile Database

Sphaerodactylus
Lizards of the Caribbean
Fauna of Saba
Fauna of Sint Eustatius
Fauna of Saint Kitts and Nevis
Reptiles described in 1938